Omiodes croceiceps is a moth in the family Crambidae. It was described by Francis Walker in 1866. It is found in Brazil (Para, Amazonas, Ega), Peru, Panama and Costa Rica.

References

Moths described in 1866
croceiceps